A by-election was held for the New South Wales Legislative Assembly electorate of Bingara on 14 September 1904 because Samuel Moore had been appointed Secretary for Mines in the Carruthers ministry. Until 1904, members appointed to a ministerial position were required to face a by-election. These were generally uncontested. On this occasion a poll was required in Bingara, Glebe (James Hogue) and Tenterfield (Charles Lee) and all were comfortably re-elected. The four other ministers, Joseph Carruthers (St George), James Ashton (Goulburn), Broughton O'Conor (Sherbrooke) and Charles Wade (Gordon), were re-elected unopposed.

Dates

Result

Samuel Moore was appointed Secretary for Mines in the Carruthers ministry.

See also
Electoral results for the district of Bingara

Notes

References

1904 elections in Australia
New South Wales state by-elections
1900s in New South Wales